Antoine de la Mothe, sieur de Cadillac (March 5, 1658October 16, 1730), born Antoine Laumet, was a French explorer and adventurer in New France, which stretched from Eastern Canada to Louisiana on the Gulf of Mexico. He rose from a modest beginning in Acadia in 1683 as an explorer, trapper, and a trader of alcohol and furs, achieving various positions of political importance in the colony. He was the commander of Fort de Buade in St. Ignace, Michigan, in 1694. In 1701, he founded Fort Pontchartrain du Détroit (which became the city of Detroit); he 
was commandant of the fort until 1710. Between 1710 and 1716, he was the governor of Louisiana, although he did not arrive in that territory until 1713.

His knowledge of the coasts of New England and the Great Lakes area was appreciated by Frontenac, governor of New France, and Pontchartrain, Secretary of State for the Navy. This earned him various favors, including the Order of Saint Louis from King Louis XIV. The Jesuits in Canada, however, accused him of perverting the Indians with his alcohol trading, and he was imprisoned for a few months in Quebec in 1704, and again in the Bastille on his return to France in 1717.

Upon his arrival in America, La Mothe adopted his title after the town of Cadillac, Gironde in southwestern France. The city of Detroit became the world center of automobile production in the 20th century. William H. Murphy and Henry M. Leland founded the Cadillac auto company and paid homage to him by using his name for their company and his self-created armorial bearings as its logo in 1902. Various places bear his name in America, in particular Cadillac Mountain in Maine and the town of Cadillac, Michigan.

He was widely hailed as a hero until the 1950s and the rise of liberal scholarship, but more recent writers have criticized him. One, W. J. Eccles, claims that "he most definitely was not one of the 'great early heroes' and probably deserves to be ranked with the 'worst scoundrels ever to set foot in New France'."

Early life

Cadillac was born Antoine Laumet on March 5, 1658, in the small town of Saint-Nicolas-de-la-Grave in the province of Gascony (today in the Tarn-et-Garonne, Occitanie). His father, Jean Laumet, was born in the village of Caumont-sur-Garonne. He became a lawyer in the Parliament of Toulouse. In 1652 Jean was appointed lieutenant to the judge of Saint-Nicolas-de-la-Grave by Cardinal Mazarin. He was appointed as a judge in 1664. Antoine's mother, Jeanne Péchagut, was the daughter of a merchant and landowner. La Mothe's adult correspondence reveals that his youth included rigorous study at a Jesuit institution where he learned theology, the law, agriculture, botany and zoology.

In a record of service he filled out in 1675, he said that he had enlisted in the military as a cadet at the age of 17 in the Dampierre regiment, in Charleroi, nowadays Belgium. Two years later in personal letters, however, he reported that he had been an officer in the Clérambault regiment in Thionville, and in 1682 he had joined the Albret regiment, in Thionville.

At the age of 25, Antoine Laumet departed from France to the New World. His father lost a lawsuit against a lawyer in Castelsarrasin that caused him financial difficulties. In addition, he had lost financial support following the death of Cardinal Mazarin and suffered the current intolerance against Protestants. Laumet may have embarked on his voyage by devious means, as historians have not found his name on any passenger list of ships departing from a French port.

New France
In 1683, Antoine Laumet arrived at Port Royal, the capital of Acadia. During the next four years, he explored his new country in all directions, extending his explorations to New England and New Holland, pushing south to the Caroline, now North Carolina and South Carolina, and learning some Native American languages and habits. He probably entered into a business relationship with Denis Guyon, a merchant of Quebec. On June 25, 1687, he married Guyon's daughter, Marie-Thérèse, 17, in Quebec.

The marriage certificate is the first document that records his new identity. He identified as "Antoine de Lamothe, écuyer, sieur de Cadillac", and signed as "De Lamothe Launay". Like many immigrants, he took advantage of emigrating to the New World to create a new identity, perhaps to conceal the reasons that drove him from France. This new identity "ne sort pas de son sac" ("I did not create this identity out of nowhere"), as he wrote later. Antoine Laumet likely remembered Sylvestre d'Esparbes de Lussan de Gout, baron of Lamothe-Bardigues, lord of Cadillac, Launay and Le Moutet; adviser to the Parliament of Toulouse. He knew him for at least two reasons: Bardigues, Cadillac, Launay and Le Moutet are villages and localities close to his birthplace, Saint-Nicolas-de-la-Grave, and Antoine's father Jean Laumet was a lawyer in the Parliament of Toulouse.

The sons likely encountered each other during their studies. Second son in his family, Laumet identified with the second son of the baron. He used the phonic similarity between his own name and that of Launay, creating the name: Antoine de Lamothe-Launay. He took the title of écuyer (squire), the rank held by a family's second son, followed by the title  sieur (sire) of Cadillac. This accorded with the Gascon custom whereby the junior family member succeeds the elder son upon the latter's death. Laumet created a new name, identity and noble origin, while protecting himself from possible recognition by persons who knew him in France.

In addition, he presented his own titles of nobility, as illustrated by armorial bearings that he created by associating the shield with the three « merlettes » (birds with no legs or bill) of the baron de Lamothe-Bardigues and that of the Virès family (of France's Languedoc region).

The marriage proved to be a fertile one. The Lamothe-Cadillac couple had six daughters and seven sons: Judith (1689), Magdeleine (1690), Marie Anne (1701), ? (1702), Marie-Thérèse (1704), Marie-Agathe (December 1707) and Joseph (1690), Antoine (1692), Jacques (1695), Pierre-Denis (1699–1700), Jean-Antoine (January 1707 – 1709), François (1709), René-Louis (1710–1714).

Les Douacques
In 1688, the governor Jacques-René de Brisay de Denonville gave him the concession of the seigniory (estate) of Les Douacques (which later became the town of Bar Harbor, Maine, well known today as a tourist town, but then for fishing and lobsters). His concession brought him no income, even from agriculture. Lamothe entered into a trading partnership with officers of Port Royal, an activity facilitated by using a ship owned by his brothers-in-law Guyon. In 1689, he was sent on an expedition in the vicinity of Boston. Upon his return, he asked the governor of Acadia, Louis-Alexandre des Friches de Méneval, for a job as notary, to bring in a minimum income; his request was turned down. Then, Cadillac was introduced to the governor Louis de Buade de Frontenac in Quebec, who sent him on an exploratory mission along the coasts of New England, aboard the frigate L'Embuscade (The Ambush). Strong head winds forced the ship to return to France.

In 1690, Cadillac was in Paris. He became part of the circle of the Secretary of State for the Navy, the marquis de Seignelay, then of his successor Louis Phélypeaux, comte de Pontchartrain, who appointed him officer of marine troops. On his return to Port Royal, LaMothe learned that the English admiral William Phips had seized the city, and that his wife, daughter, and son were being held captives. They were released in exchange for some English prisoners. In 1691, Cadillac repatriated his family to Quebec, but their ship was attacked by a privateer out of Boston, who took possession of all their goods.

Cadillac was promoted to lieutenant in 1692. He was sent with the cartographer Jean-Baptiste-Louis Franquelin to draw charts of the New England coastline in preparation for a French attack on the English colonies. He set out again for France to hand over the charts, together with a report, to the Secretary of State Pontchartrain. In 1693, he got an allowance of 1500 pounds for his work and was sent back on a further mission to supplement his observations. Frontenac promoted him to captain, then lieutenant commander in 1694.

Michilimackinac (1694–1696)
Cadillac was appointed commander of all the stations of the Pays d'En-Haut (the upper countries). He left France at the peak of his career to take up his command of Fort de Buade or Michilimackinac, which controlled all fur trading between Missouri, Mississippi, the Great Lakes, and the Ohio valley. Cadillac gave his wife power of attorney to sign contracts and notarize documents in his absence.

In 1695, Cadillac traveled to explore the area of the Great Lakes and to draw up charts. He had the idea of starting a fort in the straits between Lakes Erie and Huron to compete with the English. In Michilimackinac, he came into conflict with the Jesuit fathers, such as Étienne de Carheil, who accused him of supplying alcohol to the Indians. This was prohibited by a royal decree.

In 1696, to mitigate the difficulties of fur trading, the king ordered the closing of all trading posts, including Michilimackinac. Cadillac returned to Montreal. In 1697, he was authorized to return to France to present his project of a new fort on the strait to the Secretary of State Pontchartrain; Frontenac requested that he be promoted to lieutenant commander. However, Canadian notables strongly opposed the project which, they believed, would lead to the ruin of Quebec and Montreal. Only in 1699 did Cadillac get the support of Pontchartrain to implant the new fort; this was authorized in 1700 by the king, who entrusted its command to Cadillac.

Le Détroit (1701–1710)
On July 24, 1701, Antoine de La Mothe-Cadillac founded Fort Pontchartrain and the parish of Sainte-Anne on the straits ("le détroit " in French). He was helped by Alphonse de Tonti. Their wives joined them in October. In 1702, Cadillac went back to Quebec to request the monopoly of all fur-trading activities and the transfer to his authority of the Amerindian tribes in the area of the straits. He became a shareholder in the "Company of the Colony." After return to the straits, he helped in welcoming and settling the native tribes formerly installed at Michillimakinac.

A fire devastated Fort Pontchartrain in 1703. This disaster destroyed all the registers and records. Cadillac was recalled to Quebec in 1704 to face charges of trafficking in alcohol and furs. Although he was imprisoned as a preventive measure for a few months, his name was cleared in 1705. The king guaranteed him all his titles and granted him the fur-trading monopoly he sought. Two years later, Cadillac was charged with multiple counts of abuse of authority; Pontchartrain appointed a representative, Daigremont, to investigate. He formulated an indictment against Cadillac in 1708.

In 1709, the troops stationed on the straits were given the order to return to Montreal. In 1710, the king named Cadillac governor of La Louisiane, the expansive Louisiana (New France) territory, and ordered him to take up his duties immediately, traveling via the Mississippi River.

Louisiana (1710–1716)

Cadillac did not obey. He drew up a general inventory of the straits, and then, in 1711, boarded a ship, with his family, bound for France. In Paris, in 1712, he convinced the Toulouse-born financier Antoine Crozat to invest in Louisiana.

In June 1713, the Cadillac family arrived at Fort Louis, Louisiana (now Mobile, Alabama), after a tiring crossing. In 1714, Crozat recommended the construction of forts along the Mississippi River, whereas Cadillac wished to strengthen defenses at the mouth of the River and to develop trade with nearby Spanish colonies.

In 1715, Cadillac and his son Joseph prospected in the Illinois Country (Upper Louisiana), where they claimed to have discovered a copper mine, although there is no copper ore in that area. They established a farm and founded the settlement of St. Philippe on the east side of the Mississippi River. Cadillac directed the first mining of lead in present-day Missouri at what is now called Mine La Motte on the west side of the river. The French brought in slaves to work at the mine; they were the first people of African descent in the future state of Missouri. The production of lead was important for ammunition in the colonies. The Southeast Missouri Lead District is still a major source of that metal.

After many arguments, Crozat withdrew any authority Cadillac had in the company. The following year, he ordered Cadillac removed from colonial office.

Castelsarrasin (1717–1730)
The Cadillac family returned to France and, in 1717, settled in La Rochelle. Cadillac went to Paris with his son Joseph. They were arrested immediately and imprisoned in the Bastille for five months. They were released in 1718, and Cadillac was decorated with the Order of Saint Louis to reward his 30 years of loyal services. He settled in the paternal home, where he dealt with his parents' estate.

He also made many trips to Paris to have his rights to the concession on the straits recognized. He prolonged his stay in Paris in 1721, giving another general power of attorney to his wife to sign documents in his absence. He was finally vindicated in 1722. He sold his estate on the straits to Jacques Baudry de Lamarche, a Canadian. The French government appointed Cadillac as governor and mayor of Castelsarrasin, close to his birthplace.

Antoine de Lamothe-Cadillac died on October 16, 1730, in Castelsarrasin (Occitanie), "around the midnight hour", at the age of 72. He was buried in a vault of the Carmelite Fathers' church.

Legacy
Some of Antoine de Lamothe-Cadillac's far-reaching visions were developed after he had left New France. For instance, Jean-Baptiste Le Moyne de Bienville founded the city of New Orleans, near the mouth of the Mississippi River, in 1718, and it became a major port and city of New France.

  
 
The straits became a strategic location. Fort Pontchartrain du Détroit enjoyed an ideal location between the Great Lakes and the river basins. The fort would be succeeded by Fort Detroit and Fort Wayne and by Fort Amherstburg and Fort Malden on the opposite shore.

The car brand Cadillac was named after him, and its headquarters was in Detroit, where Cadillac himself explored.

Antoine de la Mothe Cadillac was honored with a 3-cent stamp on July 24, 1951, to commemorate the 250th anniversary of his landing at Detroit in 1701. The stamp's background design depicts Detroit's skyline as it appeared in 1951 and the foreground shows Cadillac's landing at Detroit in 1701.

On April 20, 2016, the public French high school in Windsor, Ontario, was renamed in Cadillac's honour.

During the first decade of the 20th century, a street in the Guybourg area in Longue-Pointe (now Mercier) on the island of Montreal was named in honour of Cadillac. In 1976, Cadillac station on the green line of the Montreal Metro was opened at this street.

References

Further reading
 Brasseaux, Carl A. "Lamothe Cadillac, Antoine Laumet de"; American National Biography Online Feb. 2000
 Bush, Karen Elizabeth. First Lady of Detroit: The Story of Marie-Therese Guyon, MME Cadillac (Wayne State University Press, 2001)
 Eccles, William J.  Frontenac, the Courtier Governor (1959)
 Knudsen, Anders. Antoine de la Mothe Cadillac: French Settlements at Detroit and Louisiana (Crabtree Publishing Company, 2006)
 Laut, Agnes Christina. Cadillac, knight errant of the wilderness: founder of Detroit, governor of Louisiana from the Great lakes to the Gulf (1931)
 Yves F. Zoltvany. "Laumet, dit de Lamothe Cadillac, Antoine," Dictionary of Canadian Biography Online vol 2

In French
 René Toujas, Le Destin extraordinaire du Gascon Lamothe-Cadillac de Saint-Nicolas-de-la-Grave fondateur de Detroit, 1974
 Robert Pico, Cadillac, l'homme qui fonda Detroit, Editions Denoël, 1995, 
 Annick Hivert-Carthew, Antoine de Lamothe Cadillac Le fondateur de Detroit, XYZ éditeur, 1996, 
 Jean Boutonnet, LAMOTHE-CADILLAC Le gascon qui fonda Détroit (1658 / 1730), Edition Guénégaud, 2001, 
 Jean Maumy, Moi, Cadillac, gascon et fondateur de Détroit, Editions Privat, 2002,

External links
 
 Birth place in Saint-Nicolas-de-la-Grave
 Biography, Dictionary of Canadian Biography Online
 A detailed history of Antoine Laumet
 Catholic Encyclopedia article
 

1658 births
1730 deaths
People from Tarn-et-Garonne
French explorers of North America
French Roman Catholics
History of Detroit
People of pre-statehood Michigan
Governors of Louisiana (New France)
People of New France
Order of Saint Louis recipients
Explorers of the United States